Connie Schultz (born July 21, 1957) is an American writer and journalist. Schultz is a nationally syndicated columnist for Creators Syndicate. She worked at The Cleveland Plain Dealer newspaper from 1993 to 2011. She won the 2005 Pulitzer Prize for Commentary for "her pungent columns that provided a voice for the underdog and underprivileged". She is married to Sherrod Brown, Democratic U.S. Senator from Ohio, and resigned from the paper to avoid a conflict of interest. She teaches journalism at Kent State University.

Early life
Connie Schultz was born to Alvina Jane (née BeBout) and Charles Craig Schultz. Her siblings are Leslie, Toni, and Charles.  In 1975, Schultz graduated from Ashtabula High School. In 1979, Schultz received a B.A., Journalism, Political Science, from Kent State University.

Career
Schultz was a freelance writer, 1978–1993, then Cleveland Plain Dealer columnist 1993—2011.

Because of her husband's 2006 Senate campaign, Schultz took a leave of absence from The Plain Dealer to campaign for his election. She returned to The Plain Dealer in January 2007. On September 19, 2011, Schultz again resigned from The Plain Dealer, having written in a note to colleagues that "in recent weeks, it has become painfully clear that my independence, professionally and personally, is possible only if I'm no longer writing for the newspaper that covers my husband's senate race on a daily basis".

Schultz's first book, Life Happens: And Other Unavoidable Truths, a collection of her previously published columns, was printed in 2006. Her second book, ... and His Lovely Wife: A Memoir from the Woman Beside the Man, a journal of her experiences on the campaign trail, was released in 2007. Her third book, a novel, was published in June 2020. This book explores rural Northeast Ohio across three generations of women and the stories that collectively formed their lives.

Schultz writes a column called "Views" for Parade and she has contributed to the online political blog The Huffington Post. On July 13, 2009, she appeared on CBS' The Late Late Show with Craig Ferguson. In June 2021, Schultz became an opinion columnist for USA Today.

Her weekly print columns are syndicated through Creators Syndicate.

On May 18, 2014, Schultz was presented with an honorary doctor of letters degree from Otterbein University. Along with her husband, Schultz gave a keynote address at the undergraduate commencement.

Schultz will leave Kent State University after the spring 2023 semester, and join Denison University, in Granville, Ohio, in the fall of 2023.

Recognition
Schultz won the 2004 Batten Medal. In 2005, for commentary, Schultz won the Pulitzer Prize, Scripps-Howard Award, and National Headliners Award.

Works
Life Happens: And Other Unavoidable Truths, Random House (April 18, 2006) 
… and His Lovely Wife: A Memoir from the Woman Beside the Man, Random House (June 19, 2007) 
The Daughters of Erietown: A Novel, Random House (June 9, 2020)

References

External links
 columns at The Plain Dealer
 column archive at Creators Syndicate
 column archive at The Huffington Post
 
 A Woman over 50: A Life Unleashed — Ted Talk

1957 births
American columnists
Cleveland–Marshall College of Law alumni
Kent State University alumni
Living people
Writers from Cleveland
Pulitzer Prize for Commentary winners
People from Ashtabula, Ohio
Spouses of Ohio politicians
Journalists from Ohio
20th-century American journalists